Ned Ryun is an American conservative activist and the founder and CEO of American Majority, a conservative organization that trains candidates and activists.

Education and background 
Ryun is the son of Jim Ryun, the former Republican congressman and distance runner.

Career in government and as conservative activist
Ryun was a speechwriter for President George W. Bush. He is the founder and president of American Majority, a Virginia-based conservative political training institute allied with the Tea Party movement. The group was founded in 2008. Its 501(c)(4) affiliate is American Majority Action, of which Ryun was CEO. Ryun has been a board member of the American Conservative Union. During the 2011 Wisconsin protests against Republican Governor Scott Walker's proposal to restrict collective bargaining and organized labor, Ryun helped organize counter-demonstrations in favor of the legislation.

A career Republican Party operative, as of 2013 Ryun was the CEO of Voter Gravity, a Republican data firm used for the party's get out the vote efforts; the company created "tablet and smartphone accessible canvassing maps, walk lists, voter information and dialing tools." In 2016, Ryun was a long-shot candidate for the chairmanship of the Republican National Committee.

Ryun was a staunch ally of Donald Trump. In 2017, Ryun critiqued the Republican tax proposal for not going far enough, accusing the bill of being " a grab bag of goodies for the uberwealthy globalists." In September 2020, after Supreme Court Justice Ruth Bader Ginsburg died, Ryun pushed for Trump to fill the vacancy created by Ginsburg's death before the November 2020 presidential election. He pushed for Trump to nominate Amy Coney Barrett over Barbara Lagoa. Ryun was appointed by Trump to his 1776 Commission, which produced a report on American history that likened progressivism to fascism; the report was criticized by historians.

Ryun is the author of two books:

 The Adversaries: A Story of Boston and Bunker Hill (2021) 
 Restoring Our Republic: The Making of the Republic and How We Reclaim It Before It's Too Late (2019) 

In addition, he has co-authored two books with his father and twin brother, Drew Ryun:
Heroes Among Us (2002) 
The Courage to Run (Gospel Light Publications: 2006),

References

External links
 NedRyun.com

Living people
American activists
People from Purcellville, Virginia
People from Santa Barbara, California
University of Kansas alumni
Writers from Virginia
Kansas Republicans
Virginia Republicans
Year of birth missing (living people)
Conservatism in the United States
Activists from Virginia